Charing is a village in Kent, England

Charing can also refer to:

Charing, Georgia, a community in the United States
Charing, Tibet, a village in Tibet
Charing (painting), also known as Una Mestiza
Charing, London, former village now known as Charing Cross